The 2012 Hell in a Cell was the fourth annual Hell in a Cell professional wrestling pay-per-view (PPV) event produced by WWE. It was held on October 28, 2012, at Philips Arena in Atlanta, Georgia. The event drew a total of 199,000 buys, which is an improvement over the previous year's event which drew 182,000 buys.

Eight matches were contested at the event with no matches on the pre-show. In the main event, CM Punk defeated Ryback in a Hell in a Cell match to retain the WWE Championship, ending Ryback's undefeated streak. In other prominent matches, Big Show defeated Sheamus to win the World Heavyweight Championship and Eve Torres defeated Layla and Kaitlyn to retain the WWE Divas Championship.

Production

Background 
Hell in a Cell is a gimmick pay-per-view (PPV) event produced annually in October by WWE since 2009. The concept of the show comes from WWE's established Hell in a Cell match, in which competitors fight inside a 20-foot-high roofed cell structure surrounding the ring and ringside area. The main event match of the card is contested under the Hell in a Cell stipulation. The 2012 event was the fourth event under the Hell in a Cell chronology and was held on October 28 at Philips Arena in Atlanta, Georgia.

Storylines 
The professional wrestling matches at Hell in a Cell featured professional wrestlers performing as characters in scripted events pre-determined by the hosting promotion, WWE. Storylines between the characters played out on WWE's primary television programs, Raw and SmackDown.

The main program involved CM Punk defending his WWE Championship against Ryback, contested inside Hell in a Cell. At Night of Champions the previous month, CM Punk and John Cena fought each other to a draw when Cena left his shoulders down while pinning Punk, making it a double pin. Following this, he continuously challenged Punk to a rematch, even while recovering from an arm surgery earlier in the month; Punk refused to accept. All the while Ryback, who was undefeated since re-entering WWE in April (not including his time as the character Skip Sheffield), had attempted to confront Punk with Punk usually escaping. This culminated on an episode of Raw where WWE Chairman Vince McMahon arrived and forced Punk to choose whether he wanted to face John Cena or Ryback. However, when Punk took too long to decide, with Cena's endorsement, McMahon made the decision for it to be Ryback. It was announced that it would be a  Hell in a Cell match.

At Night of Champions, Layla was originally set to defend the WWE Divas Championship against Kaitlyn, but at the event, Kaitlyn was attacked by a villainess in a masked disguise. Eve Torres replaced Kaitlyn and defeated Layla to capture the Divas Championship, and after Eve's successful defenses against Kaitlyn and Layla on back-to-back editions of Raw, Aksana was revealed as Kaitlyn's attacker on the October 26 edition of SmackDown, committing the attack under Eve's orders. It was later announced that Eve would defend the Divas Championship at Hell in a Cell in a Triple Threat Match.

WWE Tag Team Championship #1 Contenders tournament
The lead up to the event featured a tag team tournament to decide the number one contenders for the WWE Tag Team Championship.

(*)-The final was originally scheduled for October 15 but was postponed due to Mysterio's illness.

Event

Lilian Garcia was involved in a car accident before the event in Los Angeles, California, Tony Chimel substituted for her. When Jerry "The King" Lawler had been recovering from a heart attack, Michael Cole was joined in commentary by Jim Ross and John "Bradshaw" Layfield.

Preliminary matches 
The event opened with Randy Orton facing Alberto Del Rio. Orton won the match after Del Rio missed an Enziguiri and performed an RKO on Del Rio for the pin. 

Next, Team Hell No (Kane and Daniel Bryan) defended the WWE Tag Team Championship against Team Rhodes Scholars (Damien Sandow and Cody Rhodes). Kane was disqualified after he attacked Sandow and Rhodes, meaning Team Hell No retained the title.

After that, Kofi Kingston defended the Intercontinental Championship against The Miz. Kingston executed Trouble in Paradise to retain the title.

In the fourth match, Antonio Cesaro defended the United States Championship against Justin Gabriel. After countering a Suicide Dive with a European Uppercut, Cesaro executed the Neutralizer on Gabriel to retain the title.

Next, Rey Mysterio and Sin Cara faced the Prime Time Players (Darren Young and Titus O'Neil). Mysterio and Cara won after Mysterio performed a 619 and a diving splash on Young.

After that, Sheamus defended the World Heavyweight Championship against Big Show. Big Show dominated Sheamus throughout the match. Big Show executed a Chokeslam on Sheamus for a near-fall. Sheamus executed White Noise on Big Show for a near-fall. Big Show executed a WMD on Sheamus for a near-fall. Sheamus executed a Brogue Kick on Big Show for a near-fall. Sheamus attempted a second Brogue Kick but Big Show avoided and executed a second WMD on Sheamus to win the title.

In the seventh match, Eve Torres defended the WWE Divas Championship against Layla and Kaitlyn in a Triple Threat match. In the end, Eve executed a senton bomb on both Kaitlyn and Layla, pinning Layla to retain the title.

Main event 
In the main event, CM Punk defended the WWE Championship against Ryback inside Hell in a Cell. Ryback gained the early advantage but Paul Heyman distracted Ryback, allowing Punk to spray Ryback with a fire extinguisher. Punk attempted to attack him with a steel chair but Ryback countered with a big boot, causing the chair to hit Punk, and threw Punk into the cell wall. Punk attacked Ryback with a Kendo stick but Ryback was unaffected and performed a Meat Hook Clothesline on Punk. Ryback attempted Shellshocked but the referee Brad Maddox inexplicably stopped Ryback and attacked him with a low-blow. Punk pinned Ryback with a roll-up as Maddox made a fast count, thus Punk retaining the title. After the match, Maddox attempted to escape from the cell but was attacked by Ryback. After chasing Heyman, Punk attempted to escape by climbing the cell but Ryback followed him and executed Shellshocked atop the cell.

Aftermath
Maddox explained on Raw that he had intentionally cost Ryback the match as a way of making a name for himself and 'becoming famous' after he had been told that he would never achieve his initial dream of becoming a WWE Superstar. Maddox then demanded a WWE contract and a match with Ryback; Mr. McMahon sarcastically replied that Maddox would be given a 'million dollar contract' if he was able to beat Ryback. The match took place the following week, with Maddox being defeated in a squash match and leaving the arena in an ambulance. Ryback then continued his feud with CM Punk, and went on to challenge for the title once again at Survivor Series in a triple threat match with John Cena. It was later revealed on an episode of Raw that Paul Heyman had paid Brad Maddox to make an interference in the match and help CM Punk retain the title.

Results

References

External links
Official Hell in a Cell site
WWE Hell in a Cell event site

2012
Events in Atlanta
2012 in Georgia (U.S. state)
Professional wrestling in Atlanta
2012 WWE pay-per-view events
October 2012 events in the United States